In mathematics, the Trombi–Varadarajan theorem, introduced by , gives an isomorphism between a certain space of spherical functions on a semisimple Lie group, and a certain space of holomorphic functions defined on a tubular neighborhood of the dual of a Cartan subalgebra.

References
.

Harmonic analysis
Lie groups
Mathematical theorems